The Kernfysische dienst (Department of Nuclear Safety, Security and Safeguards) is the Dutch nuclear regulatory organisation. It is a part of the ministry of Ministry of Economic Affairs (Netherlands).

It is the legal supervisor of the nuclear reactors in Borssele, Petten, Dodewaard and Delft, as well as other installations dealing with civil radioactive substances.

In fact it is for the IAEA an issue of concern that the nuclear regulator is part of the same governmental agency which is also in charge of stimulating nuclear power.

References 

Nuclear regulatory organizations